The Canadian Lakehead Exhibition (CLE) is an annual regional fair in Thunder Bay, Ontario, Canada. Similar in nature to the Canadian National Exhibition in Toronto, it features local and regional artisans and farmers, a midway, concessions and numerous other activities geared towards families and people of all ages. The exhibition takes place yearly in early August and is held on the CLE grounds in the Intercity area.

Operation
The CLE is a not-for-profit organization controlled by a volunteer board of local community members. In addition to running the annual fair the board oversees the rental and leasing of facilities located on the fair grounds.

Facilities
In addition to the annual fair the CLE grounds have several buildings that are used throughout the year.

They include:

The Heritage Building
The Coliseum Building
The Dorothy E. Dove Building
The Claydon Building (also known as the Soccer Plex)
The Sports Dome (privately owned and operated leasing property from the exhibition)—NO LONGER IN OPERATION--
Famous Players Silvercity Theater (owned by Cineplex Entertainment and leasing property from the exhibition)

See also
Other Canadian annual fairs
 Canadian National Exhibition - Toronto
 Calgary Stampede - Calgary
 Edmonton K-Days - Edmonton
 Pacific National Exhibition - Vancouver
 Central Canada Exhibition - Ottawa
 Markham Fair - Markham, Ontario
 Red River Exhibition - Winnipeg
 Royal Agricultural Winter Fair - Toronto
 Royal Manitoba Winter Fair - Brandon, Manitoba
 Schomberg Fair - Schomberg, Ontario
 Sooke Fall Fair - Sooke, British Columbia
 Streetsville Bread and Honey Festival - Mississauga
 Western Fair - London, Ontario

References

External links
CLE official home page
The Sports Dome official home page

Festivals in Thunder Bay
Exhibitions in Canada
Tourist attractions in Thunder Bay District
Summer events in Canada